Kenneth King (4 December 1915 – 5 July 1997) was an English cricketer. He played 32 first-class matches for Surrey between 1936 and 1955.

See also
 List of Surrey County Cricket Club players

References

External links
 

1915 births
1997 deaths
Cricketers from Greater London
D. R. Jardine's XI cricketers
English cricketers
Surrey cricketers